Tinne Gilis (born 29 October 1997 in Mol) is a Belgian professional squash player. As of October 2022, she reached a career high ranking of number 11 in the world.

Personal life
Tinne's older sister, Nele Gilis is also a squash player and her fellow competitor on the PSA World Tour. Her younger brother Jo Gilis is a professional footballer in Belgium who has represented the Belgian national under-16 and under-17 football teams.

References

1997 births
Living people
Belgian female squash players
People from Mol, Belgium
Sportspeople from Antwerp Province
Competitors at the 2022 World Games
World Games gold medalists
World Games medalists in squash
20th-century Belgian women
21st-century Belgian women